"Worry" is the fourth single from the multicultural Australian singer Mileo featuring Norwegian pop singer Adelén. The song was released on the 17 March 2017 "Worry" is written and produced by Mileo. It has influences of Pop & World.

Composition
"Worry" is a Homme Fatale song about Mileo's view on his relationships, lyrically, the song is a sharp and unapologetic description of himself and the relationships he has.

Track listings

Chart performance

Weekly charts

Release history

References

2017 songs
Universal Music Group singles
2017 singles